is a Japanese academic researcher of foreign affairs and international and global relationships of states. He is currently the president of the University of Niigata Prefecture, and a professor emeritus at the University of Tokyo.

History 
After graduating from Niigata High School, he attended the University of Tokyo from 1962 to 1968, obtaining a bachelor's degree in liberal arts and master's degree in international relations. He studied at the Massachusetts Institute of Technology from 1968 to 1974 and obtained a Ph.D. in political science. Following his Ph.D., he taught at Sophia University from 1974 to 1977, and at the University of Tokyo from 1977 onward. He was also at the University of Geneva from 1977 to 1978, and at Harvard University from 1983 to 1984.

Research papers and other activities 
Inoguchi is a well-known author in Japan and has numerous books in print.

With no co-editorial 
 Comparative Researches on the style of the state diplomacy - China, UK and Japan -: (1978) 
 The figure of international politics and economic relations: (1982) 
 The dragonfly and peas (In original, Tombo to Edamame, nani ga yume wo kanaeru no ka ): the realization of our dreams: ( 2005 )

Personal life 
He is married to the academic and politician Kuniko Inoguchi, who he met while at Sophia University. They have twin daughters.

References

External links 
 Takashi's website

1944 births
Living people
People from Niigata (city)
University of Tokyo alumni
Academic staff of the University of Tokyo
Academic staff of Sophia University
Japanese international relations scholars
Japanese political scientists
Spouses of Japanese politicians